Aqdas Waseem is a Pakistani actor. He is widely and most popularly known for his character "Jamal" in Miss Fire.

Filmography

Filmography

Television

References 

Pakistani male actors
Year of birth missing (living people)
Living people